Prem Geet is a 1981 Indian Hindi-language film directed by Sudesh Issar. It stars Raj Babbar and Anita Raj. This was the debut film of actress Anita Raj.

Plot 
Akash Bhardwaj (Raj Babbar) is a famous poet under the pen name Nishant, which is unknown to his father Mr. Bhardwaj (Madan Puri) and mother Mrs. Laxmi Bhardwaj (Showkar Janaki). Asha (Rajni Sharma), his sister's friend loves him, but he doesn't reciprocate her feelings. On a college excursion to Shimla by, he comes across famous  dancer Shikha (Anita Raj) and falls in love with her. Unknowing of the fact that he is the famous poet Nishant whom she likes, she insults him. In a party during the song "Hothon Se Chhulo Tum", she finally found out that Akash is Nishant and she confesses her love. His father, who wants to see him as a qualified doctor, doesn't approve of the relationship. His marriage is fixed with Asha against his will. Here the story takes a turn as Shikha is diagnosed as suffering from a Brain Tumor in the final stage and has only few more days remaining to live. Akash asks his doctor friend Dr. Amar (Shashi Ranjan) to hide the same from Shikha to save her from any shock and keep her happy. He convinces his father for his marriage with Shikha, informing him about her medical condition. They are married with the initial disapproval of his mother and sister, but later everyone start liking her. After 3 months of marriage, symptoms starts to show up as dizziness and vomiting, which Mrs. Laxmi takes for her pregnancy. Whereas the gynecologist (Shammi) asks her to go for complete checkup, she finds out about her disease. While confronting Dr. Amar, she is informed that Akash as well as his father know of this and she asks her doctor not to disclose the fact to them that she also is aware of her condition. She asks Asha to look after Akash after her death. She dies on stage while performing for a charity function on her birthday after the song "Tumne Kya Kya Kiya Hai Humare Liye", telling Akash that she knows everything and is thankful to him for all the happiness he has given her.

Cast
 Raj Babbar as Akash Bhardwaj / Nishant
 Anita Raj as Shikha
 Rajni Sharma as Asha 
 Sowcar Janki as Mrs. Laxmi Bhardwaj 
 Madan Puri as Mr. Bhardwaj 
 Shashi Ranjan as Dr. Amar 
 Komal Soni 
 Sajjan as Hiralal 
 Shammi as Gynecologist 
 Raj Kishore as Professor 
 Viju Khote as Deepak Agarwal 
 Vandana Rane   
 Yasmeen
 Zubeda
 Chandermohan
 Kumar Gautam  
 Ashok Saxena  
 Sonika
 Ram Avtar as  Patient (uncredited) 
 Gulshan Grover as  Rangeela (uncredited)

Soundtrack
Music: Jagjit Singh
Lyrics: Indeevar

External links

1980s Hindi-language films
1981 films